ڄ, Arabic letter dyeh (U+0684), is an additional letter of the Arabic script, not used in the Arabic alphabet itself but used in Sindhi and Saraiki to represent a voiced palatal implosive, . For ڄ example is used in ڄموں، ڄلم۔ It is written as ॼ in Saraiki and Sindhi's Devanagari orthography.

Compound ڄ 
When 'ن'& 'ڄ' are mixed and 'نڄ' is formed Palatal nasal, . It is the sixth Special sound of Saraiki language. Some people used in last century Arabic letter nyeh ڃ (U+0683) for this compound. But now only نڄ is used. For example, نڄ is used in ونڄ، تھنڄ۔

Forms
The Arabic letter Dyeh, or ڄ, has 4 forms in total. They are:

...........

See also
ٻ
ݙ
ڳ
ݨ

References

Arabic letters